Keuruu is a town and municipality of Finland. It is located in the province of Western Finland and is part of the Central Finland region. The town center and Haapamäki village are both the most populated places in Keuruu.

The municipality is unilingually Finnish. The municipality of Pihlajavesi was consolidated with Keuruu in 1969.

Geography

Neighbouring municipalities are Jämsä, Multia, Mänttä-Vilppula, Petäjävesi, Virrat and Ähtäri.

There are 316 lakes in Keuruu, the largest of which are Keurusselkä-Ukonselkä, Pihlajavesi and Liesjärvi.

History 
Keuruu was originally known as Keuru. This name is first mentioned in 1552 as a wilderness used for hunting by the people of Sääksmäki. The northern part of the modern municipality was held by the people of Kangasala instead. Savonians settled the area in 1564, but some Tavastians also moved to their hunting grounds in the same area. At the time, it was possible to distinguish Savonians and Tavastians just by their names: Savonians had surnames, usually ending in -nen, while Tavastians had none. Out of the eleven original settlers, six were Savonians (surnames Karjalainen, Koponen, Manninen, Pynnänen, Ruoranen, Tiusanen) and five were Tavastians.

The village was first mentioned in 1567 as Köyris. It was a part of the Ruovesi parish since 1571 and until 1636. By 1571, 31 new Savonian settlers had moved into the area while only two Tavastians remained, but more Tavastians came in the 17th century. The Savonians mostly came from Rautalampi and Laukaa. The Savonians and Tavastians later mixed, the local Savonian dialect is a relic of this. The southern part held by Sääksmäki was added to the new Keuruu parish in 1640.

Multia and Pihlajavesi were originally parts of the Keuruu parish. Multia was split off in 1872 and Pihlajavesi in 1910, however Pihlajavesi rejoined Keuruu in 1969. The villages of Kivijärvi and Niemisvesi in Ähtäri were originally villages of Keuruu.

Culture

Sights and events 
The old church in Keuruu is a wooden church built in the 18th century. It now serves as a museum. The summer Keuruu Market is a popular summer event. Over the years, performers have seen e.g. Matti Nykänen and Danny. Every summer, the Pentecostal Midsummer Conference in the Great Book brings together Christians from all over Finland and the world. The home port of the MS Elias Lönnrot paddle steamer is in Keuruu. The science space is a permanent exhibition space established in Keuruu for the former Karimo school, where technology is presented mainly to young people.

Food 
In the 1980s, Keuruu's traditional parish dishes were the "gutter meat" fried in a wooden trough, a sweetened potato casserole, and bread called varituinen or varilimppu.

Notable people 

 Einari Vuorela, writer 
 Hannele Huovi, writer 
 Joni Lius, ice hockey player 
 Jukka Rautakorpi, professional ice hockey coach 
 Kalevi Sorsa, former Prime Minister of Finland 
 Matti Kassila, film director 
 Mirjami Kuosmanen, actress 
 Olli Palola, ice hockey player 
 Pirkko Vahtero, graphic designer and heraldist
Matias Saxberg, sexton and murderer

International relations

Twin towns – Sister cities

Keuruu is twinned with:

  Jõgeva, Estonia
  Szarvas, Hungary

See also
 Finnish Lake Road
 Finnish national road 58

References
Notes

External links

Town of Keuruu – Official website 
Keuruun Pallo – A football club, infamous for losing their every single game in the Finnish division 2 

 
Cities and towns in Finland
Populated places established in 1652
1652 establishments in Sweden
Populated places in Finland
Populated lakeshore places in Finland